"Born in Africa" is a song recorded by Sweden-based musician and producer Dr. Alban, released in 1996 as the second single from his fourth studio album, Born in Africa (1996). It peaked at number-one in Finland, number seven in Hungary and number eleven in Sweden, as well as topping the Swedish dance chart, with a total of 11 weeks inside that chart. On the Eurochart Hot 100, the song reached number 91.

Critical reception
Pan-European magazine Music & Media wrote, "It's not often that remixes make a difference, but in this you get two radio hits for the price of one. The original radio version has an up-tempo reggae rhythm and a poppy chorus, while Pierre J's Radio Remix is fast, hard techno with exotic background vocals and dubs."

Track listing
 CD single, Germany
"Born in Africa" (Original Radio Version) – 3:30
"Born in Africa" (Pierre J's Radio Remix) – 3:40

 CD maxi, Europe
"Born in Africa" (Original Radio Version) – 3:30
"Born in Africa" (Pierre J's Radio Remix) – 3:40
"Born in Africa" (Extended Version) – 4:57
"Born in Africa" (Pierre J's Remix) – 5:59
"Born in Africa" (Dog'n Peo Club Soda Mix) – 4:53
"Born in Africa" (Dog'n Peo Cocktail Dub) – 5:36
"Born in Africa" (2 Phat Mix) – 4:26

Charts

Weekly charts

Year-end charts

References

 

1996 singles
1996 songs
Dr. Alban songs
English-language Swedish songs
Number-one singles in Finland
Songs about Africa
Songs written by Ari Lehtonen
Songs written by Dr. Alban